Chinese Taipei  competed at the 2019 World Aquatics Championships in Gwangju, South Korea from 12 to 28 July.

Swimming

Chinese Taipei entered 14 swimmers.

Men

Women

Mixed

References

Nations at the 2019 World Aquatics Championships
Chinese Taipei at the World Aquatics Championships
2019 in Taiwanese sport